Port City FC was an American semi-professional soccer club based in Gulfport, Mississippi that competed in the National Premier Soccer League and Gulf Coast Premier League.

History 
The club was founded in 2016 as Biloxi City Futbol Club. Luke Berry, along with partners Bradley Pacher and Efren Flores, formed Biloxi City FC as a semi-professional club as a nonprofit alternative for the Mississippi Gulf Coast's soccer community.  Biloxi City FC concluded its first full season in the Gulf Coast Premier League in third place.

Roster

References

External links 
 Official website

Gulfport, Mississippi
2016 establishments in Mississippi
Association football clubs established in 2016
Soccer clubs in Mississippi